Verjan (also Romanized as Verjān, Varjān, and Vīrjān) is a village in Kahak Rural District, Kahak District, Qom County, Qom Province, Iran. At the 2006 census, its population was 763, in 226 families.

References 

Populated places in Qom Province